Sneha Yamuna is a 1977 Indian Malayalam film, directed by A. T. Raghu. The film stars Jayan, KPAC Lalitha, Lakshmi and Mohan Sharma in the lead roles. The film has musical score by K. J. Joy.

Cast
Jayan
KPAC Lalitha
Lakshmi
Mohan Sharma
Pattom Sadan
Sankaradi
M. G. Soman
Sreenivasan

Soundtrack
The music was composed by K. J. Joy and the lyrics were written by Mankombu Gopalakrishnan and Yusufali Kechery.

References

External links
 

1977 films
1970s Malayalam-language films